Team Philips was a catamaran sailing vessel built to try to take Pete Goss around the world in record time.

The design consisted of two thin, wave piercing hulls, each with its own sail, connected by high placed bridges between the hulls to minimise wave drag. It was built in Totnes, England to compete in The Race, a no-holds-barred drag race around the world. It was the biggest ocean racing yacht ever built, and there was enough space between the hulls to park 80 cars.

It pushed the boundaries and challenged the norms of ocean racing yachts in three main ways:

  unsupported wave-piercing bow sections.
 huge unstayed windsurfer-style rig.
 two masts mounted abeam of each other (side by side), one on each hull.

It initially ran into trouble during its trials in March 2000 due to errors in the computer modelling of the composite hull. The first  of the port hull broke off. It was repaired with the addition of internal bracing. It then suffered from problems with the pioneering bearings that supported the massive  masts which required further repairs.

It was abandoned during a freak storm in the mid-Atlantic in December 2000.  winds and  waves started to produce cracks in the crew's central safety pod and forced Pete Goss to send out a mayday signal.  He abandoned ship with the rest of his crew, and the vessel broke up several days later.

External links
 Team Philips yacht lost
 Scilly Archive (28 March 2000) - Team Philips
 BBC News (16 November 2000) - Team Philips back at sea
 National Maritime Museum Cornwall - Team Philips exhibition for 2005

Individual sailing vessels
Individual catamarans
Shipwrecks of the Isles of Scilly
Maritime incidents in 2000
Totnes
2000s sailing yachts